Omenn syndrome is an autosomal recessive severe combined immunodeficiency. It is associated with hypomorphic missense mutations in immunologically relevant genes of T-cells (and B-cells) such as  recombination activating genes (RAG1 and RAG2), Interleukin-7 receptor-α (IL7Rα), DCLRE1C-Artemis, RMRP-CHH, DNA-Ligase IV, common gamma chain, WHN-FOXN1, ZAP-70 and complete DiGeorge syndrome. It is fatal without treatment.

Symptoms and signs

The symptoms are very similar to graft-versus-host disease (GVHD). This is because the patients have some T cells with limited levels of recombination with the mutant RAG genes. These T cells are abnormal and have a very specific affinity for self antigens found in the thymus and in the periphery. Therefore, these T cells are auto-reactive and cause the GVHD phenotype.

A characteristic symptom is chronic inflammation of the skin, which appears as a red rash (early onset erythroderma). Other symptoms include eosinophilia, failure to thrive, swollen lymph nodes, swollen spleen, diarrhea, enlarged liver, low immunoglobulin levels (except immunoglobulin E, which is elevated), low T cell levels, and no B cells.

Genetics

Omenn syndrome is caused by a partial loss of RAG gene function and leads to symptoms similar to severe combined immunodeficiency syndrome, including opportunistic infections. The RAG genes are essential for gene recombination in the T-cell receptor and B-cell receptor, and loss of this ability means that the immune system has difficulty recognizing specific pathogens. Omenn Syndrome is characterised by the loss of T-cell function, leading to engraftment of maternal lymphocytes in the foetus and the co-existence of clonally expanded autologous and transplacental-acquired maternal lymphocytes.
Omenn syndrome can occasionally be caused in other recombination genes, including IL-7Rα and RMRP.

Diagnosis
In order to diagnose a patient specifically with Omenn Syndrome, an autosomal recessive form of SCID, a physician can order a genetic testing panel to look for 22q11 microdeletions or mutations of the RAG1/RAG2 genes.

Treatment
The only treatment for Omenn syndrome is chemotherapy followed by a bone marrow transplantation. Without treatment, it is rapidly fatal in infancy.

See also 
 Purine nucleoside phosphorylase deficiency
 List of cutaneous conditions

References

External links 

Rare syndromes
Autosomal recessive disorders
Hepatology
Noninfectious immunodeficiency-related cutaneous conditions
Combined T and B–cell immunodeficiencies